Edward Hurwitz (born March 21, 1931) is an American former diplomat. From 1983 to 1986 he was the U.S. chargé d'affaires in Afghanistan, and he served as the first U.S. ambassador to Kyrgyzstan, from 1992 to 1994. Hurwitz was born in New York City on March 21, 1931.

References

1931 births
Living people
20th-century American diplomats
Ambassadors of the United States to Afghanistan
Ambassadors of the United States to Kyrgyzstan
United States Foreign Service personnel